It Started with a Kiss is a 1959 Metrocolor film in CinemaScope starring Glenn Ford and Debbie Reynolds. It was directed by George Marshall.

Plot
After a whirlwind courtship, an Air Force staff sergeant who is a Korean War veteran, Joe Fitzpatrick, and his wife Maggie, a dancer, try to make their marriage work. Joe is posted to Spain; back in New York, his wife learns that he has won a raffle making them the owners of the custom-built 1955 Lincoln Futura concept car. The car is delivered to Spain, where it attracts attention from many people including a famous matador, who makes advances to Maggie and invites her to his estate. The car also comes to the attention of Joe's commanding officer, who insists he ship it back to the States to avoid promoting the image of Americans as snobbishly wealthy. This upsets Maggie. Joe is also told he will owe considerable income tax on the car, which he cannot afford. In the end, Joe sells the car to the matador, and he and Maggie are reconciled.

Cast
 Glenn Ford as Sgt. Joe Fitzpatrick
 Debbie Reynolds as Maggie Putnam
 Eva Gabor as Marquesa Marion de la Rey
 Gustavo Rojo as Antonio Soriano
 Fred Clark as Maj. Gen. Tim O'Connell
 Edgar Buchanan as Congressman Richard Tappe
 Harry Morgan as Charles Meriden (as Henry 'Harry' Morgan)
 Robert Warwick as Congressman Muir
 Frances Bavier as Mrs. Tappe
 Netta Packer as Mrs. Muir
 Robert Cunningham as The Major
 Alice Backes as Sally Meriden
 Carmen Phillips as Belvah
 Robert Hutton  as Alvin Ashley (uncredited)
 Richard Deacon  as Capt. Porter (uncredited)

Production notes
A scene in the movie recreated a well-known sequence from the 1938 film Bringing Up Baby, when Joe must walk in step behind Maggie to hide her torn dress.

The car used in the film – of which there was only one – was later customized by George Barris and served as the Batmobile for the 1960s TV series Batman.

Box office
According to MGM records the film earned $2,750,000 in the US and Canada and $1.9 million elsewhere, resulting in a profit of $582,000.

See also
 List of American films of 1959

References

External links
 
 
 
 

1959 films
1959 romantic comedy films
American comedy road movies
American romantic comedy films
Films directed by George Marshall
Films set in Spain
Films set in New York (state)
Metro-Goldwyn-Mayer films
Films with screenplays by Charles Lederer
1950s comedy road movies
1950s English-language films
1950s American films